Kimche is a Jewish surname.

People named Kimche 
 David Kimche (1928–2010), Israeli diplomat, deputy director of the Mossad, spymaster and journalist
 Jon Kimche (1909–1994), British journalist and historian

Jewish surnames
Hebrew-language surnames